Scylla and Charybdis is a metaphor relating to two monsters of Greek mythology:
 Scylla and
 Charybdis

Scylla and Charybdis may also refer to:
 Skylla and Charybdis (Waterhouse), 2014 composition for piano quartet by Graham Waterhouse
 Skylla und Charybdis (album) of chamber music by Graham Waterhouse
 "Scylla and Charybdis" (Ulysses episode) an episode in James Joyce's novel Ulysses
 "Torn Between Scylla and Charybdis" track on Trivium's album Shogun
 Charybde et Scylla, episode of Ulysses 31

See also
 Scylla (disambiguation)
 Charybdis (disambiguation)